Boxing has been contested at every Summer Olympic Games since its introduction to the program at the 1904 Summer Olympics, except for the 1912 Summer Olympics in Stockholm, because Swedish law banned the sport at the time. The 2008 Summer Olympics were the final games with boxing as a male only event. Since the 2012 Summer Olympics, women's boxing is part of the program.

Summary

Events
The boxing competition is organized as a set of tournaments, one for each weight class.  The number of weight classes has changed over the years (currently 8 for men and 5 for women), and the definition of each class has changed several times, as shown in the following table. Until 1936, weights were measured in pounds, and from 1948 onwards, weights were measured in kilograms.

From the 2016 Summer Olympics, male athletes no longer have to wear protective headgear in competition, due to a ruling by the AIBA and the IOC that it contributes to greater concussion risk. Female athletes will continue to wear the headgear, due to "lack of data" on the effectiveness of it on women.

Medal table
The following table is ranked by the number of golds, then silvers, then bronzes. Until 1948, losing semi-finalists held a bronze medal playoff; since 1952, both losing semi-finalists have received bronze medals.

As of the 2020 Summer Olympics, considering stripped and reallocated medals as of December 31, 2021.

Nations

See also

List of Olympic medalists in boxing
List of Olympic venues in boxing
Boxing at the Youth Olympic Games

Notes

References   

 
Sports at the Summer Olympics
Olympic Games